The Ericson 23-1 is an American trailerable sailboat that was designed by Bruce King as a cruiser and first built in 1969.

The design was originally marketed by the manufacturer as the Ericson 23, but is now usually referred to as the Ericson 23-1 to differentiate it from the unrelated 1975 Ericson 23-2 design.

Production
The design was built by Ericson Yachts in the United States from 1969 until 1971, with 140 boats completed, but it is now out of production.

Design
The Ericson 23-1 is a recreational keelboat, built predominantly of fiberglass, with wood trim. It has a masthead sloop rig, a spooned raked stem, a plumb transom, an internally mounted spade-type rudder controlled by a tiller and a fixed fin keel. It displaces  and carries  of lead ballast.

The boat is normally fitted with a small  outboard motor for docking and maneuvering.

The design has sleeping accommodation for four people, with a double "V"-berth in the bow cabin and two straight settee quarter berths in the main cabin. The galley is located on the starboard side just forward of the companionway ladder. The galley is equipped with a two-burner stove and a sink. The head is located just aft of the bow cabin on the port side.

The design has a PHRF racing  handicap of 222 to 267, with an average of 252.

Operational history
In a 2007 review in Sailing Magazine, John Kretschmer wrote, "although the boat was designed to be trailerable, this was before the advent of the SUV and it was never intended to be hauled behind the family station wagon and dragged up to the lake for weekend outings. It is a real boat masquerading as a trailersailer and most 23s remained happily afloat all season. It is nice, however, to have the option of leaving the boat on a trailer during the off-season, saving ever-increasing yard storage fees. And should you get transferred, downsized, outsourced or just plain sick of sailing in the same place, you can hitch the trailer to a husky vehicle and head to sunnier climes ... The Ericson 23 is an especially handsome boat that is easy and rewarding to sail. It is inexpensive to purchase and maintain. It's a perfect starter boat and as your skills develop it can be raced with some success."

See also
List of sailing boat types

References

Keelboats
1960s sailboat type designs
Sailing yachts
Trailer sailers
Sailboat type designs by Bruce King
Sailboat types built by Ericson Yachts